Zsolt Borhi is a Hungarian sprint canoeist who competed in the mid-1990s. He won four medals at the ICF Canoe Sprint World Championships with two golds(K-2 10000 m: 1993K-1 500 m: 1994) and two silvers (K-1 1000 m: 1994, K-4 1000 m: 1993).

References

Hungarian male canoeists
Living people
Year of birth missing (living people)
ICF Canoe Sprint World Championships medalists in kayak
20th-century Hungarian people